Edwin Vassallo (born 24 June 1961) is a Maltese former politician and businessman from the Nationalist Party who served as a member of the Parliament of Malta from 1996 to 2022. He was elected to Parliament in the 1996 Maltese general election, and took office on 5 December 1996, and would serve until 20 February 2022 when Parliament dissolved before the 2022 elections. Vassallo was defeated in 2022 elections. Vassallo served as a Parliamentary Secretary (junior minister) in various capacities under the premierships of Eddie Fenech Adami and Lawrence Gonzi from 1998 until 2008. He also served as the Mayor of Mosta from 2015 to 2016. Vassallo was also a member of the Parliamentary Petitions Committee in the Thirteenth Legislature from 2017 until 2022.

A shopkeeper, Vassallo chose to run in the 1996 elections for the Nationalist Party. Over the years, Vassallo was widely regarded as one of the most ultra-conservative members of Parliament. The Malta Today wrote in 2022 that his "shopkeeper mentality gave him a lack of sophistication that ironically brought him the allure of a man of the people, a marked distinction in a party of lawyers." Vassallo had been one of the most vocal opponents of the introduction of divorce in Malta, which was approved by voters in a 2011 referendum. He was also the only MP to oppose the introduction of same-sex marriage in Malta in 2017, and also voted against a domestic violence bill in 2018 which integrated the Istanbul Convention into Maltese law.

Personal life

Edwin Vassallo is married to Caroline, with whom he has 2 sons. They reside in Mosta.

Vassallo is a Catholic.

See also
 List of members of the parliament of Malta, 2017–2022

References

Living people
1961 births
21st-century Maltese politicians
Nationalist Party (Malta) politicians
Members of the House of Representatives of Malta